Be with Us (A Year With...) is a 2003 DVD by English girl group Atomic Kitten. The DVD mainly consists of behind the scenes footage of a year in the life of the band.

DVD information
Filmed over the course of 12 months, Liz McClarnon, Natasha Hamilton and Jenny Frost give an inside look how the music videos were recorded, give a glimpse into their private lives, and take a bike ride through Singapore. The DVD also contains footage of various major and minor performances across the globe. The timeframe coincides with the release of the Ladies Night album.

The video features the music videos for "Ladies Night", "If You Come to Me", "Be with You", "The Last Goodbye", and "The Tide Is High". The DVD also contains a photo gallery.

The DVD was certified Gold on 25 February 2005.

Track listing

Music Videos:
"Ladies Night"
"If You Come to Me"
"Be With You"
"The Last Goodbye"
"The Tide Is High (Get The Feeling)"

Plus the girls singing:
"Never Gonna Give You Up" in the lift
"Cheeky Song (Touch My Bum)" in a radio interview
"I'll Be There for You" seen in the behind the scenes of The Last Goodbye
"It's Raining Men"
"The Ketchup Song (Aserejé)"
"Rudolph The Red Nosed Reindeer"
"Live and Let Die"
"Insomnia from the movie "Faithless"
"Round Round"
"Here With Me"
and much more

References and notes

External links
 Official site

Atomic Kitten video albums
2003 video albums
Documentary films about pop music and musicians